Steve Gordon (October 10, 1938 – November 27, 1982) was an American screenwriter and film director who wrote and directed the 1981 comedy Arthur, starring Dudley Moore. Gordon died in New York City on November 27, 1982, from a heart attack. He was 44 years old.

Gordon was nominated for the Academy Award for Best Original Screenplay for Arthur. The film not only marked his directorial debut, but his only work as a film director. He had written only one previous feature film, The One and Only (1978), starring Henry Winkler, having spent several years writing for television.

Early and personal life
Gordon was born in Chester, Pennsylvania but was raised by his aunt and uncle in Ottawa Hills, Ohio, after his parents died. Gordon grew up in a Jewish family in the Toledo suburb of Ottawa Hills, Ohio, and graduated from Ottawa Hills High School in 1957. Gordon then attended Ohio State University, where he majored in political science and history; he graduated in 1961.  Gordon had resided in New York City since his graduation from Ohio State.  He never married.

Death and legacy
According to his brother, Gordon had been suffering from chest pains and had visited the doctor five days before his death. Gordon's niece was eating lunch with him at his New York City apartment when he suffered a fatal heart attack.  He was interred at Woodlawn Cemetery in Toledo, Ohio.

In December 1982, Gordon's brother, Toledo radiologist Dr. Michael Gordon, created an annual scholarship for Ottawa Hills High School students in Steve's name. In 2010 he was one of five people inducted into the Ottawa Hills Foundation's Community Hall of Fame.

Filmography
Lotsa Luck (1974) (TV)
The New Dick Van Dyke Show (1974) (TV)
Paul Sand in Friends and Lovers (1974) (TV)
Chico and the Man (1974) (TV)
Barney Miller (1975) (TV)
The Practice (1976) (TV) (Creator)
The One and Only (1978)
Good Time Harry (1980) (TV)
Arthur (1981) (Director/Writer)

References

External links 
 
 
 
 Steve Gordon by Ken Levine

American male screenwriters
American television writers
1938 births
1982 deaths
Ohio State University College of Arts and Sciences alumni
American male television writers
People from Chester, Pennsylvania
People from Ottawa Hills, Ohio
Film directors from Pennsylvania
Film directors from Ohio
Golden Globe Award-winning producers
Screenwriters from Ohio
Screenwriters from Pennsylvania
20th-century American male writers
20th-century American screenwriters